Michael Morton (born August 12, 1954) is an American who was wrongfully convicted in 1987 in a Williamson County, Texas court of the 1986 murder of his wife Christine Morton. He spent nearly 25 years in prison before he was exonerated by DNA evidence which supported his claim of innocence and pointed to the crime being committed by another individual. Morton was released from prison on October 4, 2011, and another man, Mark Alan Norwood, was convicted of the murder in 2013. The prosecutor in the case, Ken Anderson, was convicted of contempt of court for withholding evidence after the judge had ordered its release to the defense.

Early life
Michael Morton was born August 12, 1954.

First marriage
In 1976, while attending Stephen F. Austin State University, in Nacogdoches, Texas, Morton met Christine Kirkpatrick. They married in 1979 and had one child, Eric, in 1983. Eric had a congenital heart defect, which required open-heart surgery, which could not be safely attempted until he was three years old. Six weeks after their son's successful surgery, on August 12, 1986, Morton and his family celebrated his birthday. The next day, after Morton had left for work, Christine Morton was beaten to death in her bed while Eric was present.

Conviction, DNA testing and acquittal
On September 25, 1986, Morton was arrested and charged with the murder of his wife. He was convicted in February 1987 and sentenced to life in prison.

Pro bono civil attorney John Raley of Houston, Texas, together with Nina Morrison of the New York-based Innocence Project, filed Morton's motion for DNA testing in February 2005. In 2010, Morton was offered parole if he expressed remorse over murdering his wife. Raley told the Texas Tribune about the conversation he had with Morton on the subject:
 
 "...Michael said that he understood that he would be paroled if he only showed remorse for his crime. And I said, 'What are you going to do?' I didn't feel like I could advise him on that because, I mean, you know [it had been] 23 years now. I don't think anybody would have blamed him if he said, 'I'm really sorry, let me go.'
But Michael is a man of great integrity, and he would not lie to get out of prison.
And he said, 'All I have left is my actual innocence, and if I have to be in prison the rest of my life, I'm not giving that up.'...And I said, 'Michael, I promise you, I will never quit.'"

After initially being held in the Williamson County Jail, Morton was held at several Texas Department of Criminal Justice (TDCJ) prisons: the Diagnostic Unit in Huntsville, Wynne Unit in Huntsville, Ramsey I Unit in Brazoria County, and the Michael Unit in Anderson County. While imprisoned he did academic coursework, obtaining a bachelor's degree in psychology and a master's degree in literature; he requested a transfer to Ramsey for the master's program there, and was sent to Michael after he completed the program.

Raley and Morrison relentlessly sought a court order for DNA testing in state and federal courts until the testing was finally achieved in June, 2011. Williamson County District Attorney John Bradley "tenaciously fought" against DNA testing for six years before a judge finally ordered the tests.

Morton was freed on October 4, 2011 (and formally acquitted by Bexar County District Judge Sid Harle on December 19, 2011) after DNA tests linked another man, Mark Alan Norwood, to Christine Morton's murder.

Conviction of Mark Alan Norwood
Mark Alan Norwood, a Bastrop dishwasher who lived in Austin in the mid-1980s, was charged, convicted and sentenced to life imprisonment  on March 27, 2013, for the 1986 murder of Christine Morton. In September 2016, he was convicted in a separate case for the January 1988 murder of Debra Masters Baker in her Austin home. Both women were beaten to death in their beds under similar circumstances.

The Innocence Project subsequently filed a motion to remove Bradley from further court proceedings, but stopped pursuing it after Bradley agreed to dismiss the indictment against Morton, which allowed Morton to collect compensation. Under Texas law, he became eligible to receive a lump sum based on the number of years served in prison, plus a lifetime annuity of $80,000 per year, as well as job training and educational aid.

Conviction of prosecutor Ken Anderson
On November 16, 2011, Morton's original prosecutor, Ken Anderson, told reporters: "I want to formally apologize for the system's failure to Mr. Morton. In hindsight, the verdict was wrong." Baker's daughter said she was unmoved by Anderson's apology and held him partially responsible for her mother's death because he and investigators allowed a killer to escape detection by focusing so intently on Morton. "It is harder for me to hear him not holding himself accountable. He is not taking responsibility," she said.

The same day as Morton's formal acquittal, Morton's attorneys (including Raley, Morrison, Barry Scheck of the Innocence Project, and Gerald Goldstein and Cynthia Orr of San Antonio) asked Harle to order a "court of inquiry" into the actions of Anderson, who was then a district judge in Williamson County.  A court of inquiry is a special court that investigates allegations of misconduct by elected officials in Texas. Morton had accused Anderson of failing to provide defense lawyers with exculpatory evidence indicating that another man might have killed Morton's wife, including information that his 3-year-old son witnessed the murder and said that his father was not home at the time.  Morton's attorneys discovered this evidence while preparing a final appeal, and were able to get Anderson and others involved in the investigation deposed under oath.

On February 20, 2012, Harle asked the Texas Supreme Court to convene a court of inquiry, finding that there was evidence to support Morton's contention that Anderson had tampered with evidence and should have been held in contempt of court for not complying with the trial judge's order to let him review all possible exculpatory evidence.  The court of inquiry began on February 4, 2013. On April 19, 2013, the court of inquiry ordered Anderson to be arrested, saying "This court cannot think of a more intentionally harmful act than a prosecutor's conscious choice to hide mitigating evidence so as to create an uneven playing field for a defendant facing a murder charge and a life sentence."  Anderson responded by claiming immunity from any prosecution under the expiry of applicable statutes of limitation. On September 23, 2013, Anderson resigned from his position as district court judge.

On November 8, 2013, Anderson was found to be in contempt of court by 9th Judicial District Judge Kelly Moore. Anderson pled no contest to the charges as part of a plea bargain. He was sentenced to 10 days in county jail, and was ordered to report to jail no later than December 2, 2013. He received credit for one day he spent in jail in April 2013, when he was arrested following the court of inquiry. He was also fined $500, and ordered to perform 500 hours of community service. He agreed to give up his license to practice law in exchange for having the charges of evidence tampering dropped. He will be eligible to apply to have his law license reinstated after five years. On November 15, 2013, Anderson was released from jail after having served five days of his 10-day sentence; he was released early after receiving credit for good behavior.

After the plea agreement was announced, it was publicly revealed that Williamson County District Attorney Jana Duty agreed to authorize an independent review of every case that Anderson ever prosecuted, along with every case in which Bradley successfully opposed DNA testing.

The Michael Morton Act
On May 16, 2013, Governor of Texas Rick Perry signed Texas Senate Bill 1611, also called the Michael Morton Act, into law. The Act is designed to ensure a more open discovery process. The bill's open file policy removes barriers for accessing evidence. Morton was present for the signing of the bill, which became law on September 1, 2013.

Later life 
Morton lived with his parents in Liberty City, Texas after being released from prison before moving to Kilgore, Texas. He was able to reconnect with his son, Eric. Eric had been adopted by Christine Morton's sister and her husband, and had cut contact with his father when he was fifteen because he believed that he was guilty of his mother's murder.

In 2013, Morton married Cynthia May Chessman, who he met at his church.

In popular media
Morton's case was featured on CBS's 60 Minutes on March 25, 2012. It was also featured on "Katie," the Katie Couric show, on November 13, 2012.

A novel based on the case, entitled Depraved Prosecution, was published in July 2012 by Kurt Johnson, a writer living in Williamson County; in the novel the fictional location of "Wiyamsun County" is the setting.

The Morton case is also depicted in a 2013 documentary film, An Unreal Dream: The Michael Morton Story, directed by Al Reinert. The film was featured on CNN Films December 8, 2013.

Morton's memoir, "Getting Life: An Innocent Man's 25-Year Journey from Prison to Peace," was released on July 8, 2014.

See also

List of miscarriage of justice cases
List of wrongful convictions in the United States
Overturned convictions in the United States
Cameron Todd Willingham
Clarence Elkins
David Camm
Ryan Ferguson

References

External links
Michael Morton's home page
Michael Morton's Quora page

Freedom after nearly 25 years of wrongful imprisonment at 60 Minutes

Free After 25 Years: A Tale Of Murder And Injustice (NPR WEE-Sat 28APR2012)

Further reading
 Long-form exposé, with extensive, detailed background information: The Innocent Man (Texas Monthly, November 2012)
Truth finally sets Texas inmate free (Houston Chronicle, 09 October 2011)
Morton free; now State Bar must act (Austin American-Statesman Editorial Board, Oct. 8, 2011)
 Editorial: In murder exoneration, a revived debate (Dallas Morning News, 09 October 2011)
Michael Morton documentary is a reflection of grace (Austin American-Statesman, 07 March 2013) 

1954 births
Living people
Overturned convictions in the United States
People convicted of murder by Texas
Prisoners sentenced to life imprisonment by Texas
American people wrongfully convicted of murder